Sai River may refer to:

Sai River (Gujarat), a river in Gujarat, India
Sai River (Uttar Pradesh), a tributary of the River Gomti in Uttar Pradesh, India
Sai River (Gifu), a river in Gifu Prefecture, Japan
Sai River (Ishikawa), a river near Kanazawa in Ishikawa Prefecture, Japan
Sâi, a tributary of the Danube in Romania
Sai River (Thailand), a river that forms the border between Thailand and Burma